Melzo is a railway station in Italy. Located on the Milan–Venice railway, it serves the town of Melzo.

Services
Melzo is served by lines S5 and S6 of the Milan suburban railway network, operated by the Lombard railway company Trenord.

See also
 Milan suburban railway network

References

External links

Railway stations in Lombardy
Milan S Lines stations
Railway stations opened in 1846
1846 establishments in the Austrian Empire
Railway stations in Italy opened in 1846